Shannon Culpepper, known professionally as Shannon Sinn, is an American mixed martial artist who competes at Invicta FC in the Flyweight division and has fought 3 times for the organization.

Mixed martial arts record

|-
|Loss
|align=center|5–8
|Kaytlin Neil
|Decision (unanimous)
|SFN March Madness
|
|align=center|5
|align=center|5:00
|Salt Lake City, Utah, United States
|For the SFN Flyweight Championship.
|-
|Loss
|align=center|5–7
|Cheri Muraski
|Decision (unanimous)
|SCL Queen of Sparta: Flyweight
|
|align=center|3
|align=center|5:00
|Denver, Colorado, United States
|
|-
|Loss
|align=center|5–6
|Sabina Mazo
|Decision (unanimous)
|LFA 37
|
|align=center|5
|align=center|5:00
|Sioux Falls, South Dakota, United States
|
|-
|Win
|align=center|5–5
|Heather Bassett
|TKO (punches)
|SCL 64: Awakening
|
|align=center|1
|align=center|2:50
|Denver, Colorado, United States
|
|-
|Win
|align=center|4–5
|Katy Collins
|Decision (unanimous) 
|LFA 21
|
|align=center|3
|align=center|5:00
|Branson, Missouri, United States
|
|-
|Loss
|align=center|3–5
|Cheri Muraski
|Submission 
|SCL AVM 8
|
|align=center|2
|align=center|3:58
|Loveland, Colorado, United States
|
|-
|Win
|align=center|3–4
|Ashley Deen
|Decision (split)
|SCL 57: Dynamite
|
|align=center|3
|align=center|5:00
|Denver, Colorado, United States
|
|-
|Loss
|align=center|2–4
|Jenny Liou Shriver
|Submission (armbar)
|SCL 49: Revenge
|
|align=center|3
|align=center|2:53
|Denver, Colorado, United States
|
|-
|Loss
|align=center|2–3
|Christine Stanley
|Decision (unanimous)
|Invicta FC 17: Evinger vs. Schneider
|
|align=center|3
|align=center|5:00
|Costa Mesa, California, United States
|
|-
|Win
|align=center|2–2
|Maureen Riordon
|Decision (unanimous)
|Invicta FC 12: Kankaanpää vs. Souza
|
|align=center|3
|align=center|5:00
|Kansas City, Missouri, United States
|
|-
|Loss
|align=center|1–2
|Andrea Lee
|Decision (unanimous)
|Invicta FC 9: Honchak vs. Hashi
|
|align=center|3
|align=center|5:00
|Davenport, Iowa, United States
|
|-
|Loss
|align=center|1–1
|Alice Smith Yauger
|Decision (unanimous)
|SCL Heat
|
|align=center|3
|align=center|5:00
|Castle Rock, Colorado, United States
|
|-
|Win
|align=center|1–0
|Courtney Himes
|Submission (armbar)
|SCL Army vs. Marines 5
|
|align=center|1
|align=center|0:51
|Loveland, Colorado, United States
|
|-

References

Mixed martial artists from Colorado
American female mixed martial artists
Flyweight mixed martial artists
Mixed martial artists utilizing boxing
Mixed martial artists utilizing kickboxing
American women boxers